Andrey Kuznetsov was the defending champion, but he did not participate this year.

Íñigo Cervantes won the title, defeating Adam Pavlásek in the final, 7–6(7–5), 6–4.

Seeds

Draw

Finals

Top half

Bottom half

References
 Main Draw
 Qualifying Draw

Prosperita Open - Singles